Fagnolle Castle is a castle located in the district of Fagnolle, in the municipality of Philippeville, Wallonia, Belgium, and in the Fagne region. The castle was formerly the centre of government of the small independent Barony, later County, of Fagnolle. It was constructed in the 12th century, and is now ruined.

See also
List of castles in Belgium

Castles in the Ardennes (Belgium)
Castles in Belgium
Castles in Namur (province)
Philippeville